Vladislav Vitalyevich Glinsky (born 29 May 2000) is a Belarusian professional footballer who plays for Vitebsk.

References

External links 
 
 

2000 births
Living people
People from Polotsk
Sportspeople from Vitebsk Region
Belarusian footballers
Association football defenders
FC Torpedo Minsk players
FC BATE Borisov players
FC Isloch Minsk Raion players
FC Vitebsk players